David Robert Hale (born June 21, 1947) is a former American football defensive tackle in the National Football League (NFL) who played for the Chicago Bears. He played college football at Ottawa University.

References 

1947 births
Living people
People from McCook, Nebraska
Players of American football from Nebraska
American football defensive tackles
Ottawa Braves football players
Chicago Bears players